Soul Fixin' Man is an album by American blues guitarist Luther Allison, released in 1994 by Alligator Records. It is also known as Bad Love. Some editions have a different track listing.

Critical reception

Scott Yanow wrote on AllMusic, "A powerful player whose intensity on this set sometimes borders on rock (although remaining quite grounded in blues), Luther Allison (who contributed eight of the dozen songs) displays the large amount of musical growth he had experienced since the mid-'70s. Joined by his quintet, the Memphis Horns, and (on "Freedom") a choir, Allison is heard throughout in top form."

Track listing
"Bad Love" (Luther Allison, James Solberg) - 6:23
"I Want to Know" (Ron Badger, Sugar Pie DeSanto, Robert Geddins) - 4:52
"Soul Fixin' Man" (Allison, Solberg) - 3:07
"Middle of the Road" (Allison) - 4:55
"She Was Born That Way" (Bob Johnson, Sam Mosley) - 4:38
"Give It All" (Allison) - 3:56
"You Been Teasin' Me" (Allison, Solberg) - 3:01
"Nobody but You" (Allison, Solberg) - 4:30
"Put Your Money Where Your Mouth Is" (Allison, Solberg) - 6:28
"The Things I Used to Do" (Guitar Slim) - 3:18
"Love String" (Johnson, Mosley) - 3:53
"Freedom" (Allison, Michael Carras, Oscar Brown, Jr., Frank "Fast Frank" Rabaste) - 4:47

Personnel
Luther Allison - vocals, guitar
Kpe Lee - percussion
James Robinson - drums
David Smith - bass guitar
James Solberg - guitar
Ernest Williamson - keyboards
Wayne Jackson - trombone, trumpet
Andrew Love - saxophone
Jacqueline Johnson - backing vocals
Another Blessed Creation Choir - chorus

References

1994 albums
Luther Allison albums
Alligator Records albums